Longmen Township is a township of Laishui County in the foothills of the Taihang Mountains of western Hebei province, China, located about  northwest of the county seat. , it has 20 villages under its administration.

References 

Township-level divisions of Hebei